Ernesto Arturo Miranda (March 9, 1941 – January 31, 1976) was an American criminal and laborer whose conviction on kidnapping, rape, and armed robbery charges based on his confession under police interrogation was set aside in the landmark U.S. Supreme Court case Miranda v. Arizona, which ruled that criminal suspects must be informed of their right against self-incrimination and their right to consult with an attorney before being questioned by police. This warning is known as a Miranda warning.

After the Supreme Court decision invalidated Miranda's initial conviction, the state of Arizona tried him again. At the second trial, with his confession excluded from evidence, he was convicted. He was sentenced to 20–30 years in prison.

Biography

Early life
Ernesto Arturo Miranda was born in Mesa, Arizona on March 9, 1941. Miranda began getting in trouble when he was in grade school. Shortly after his mother died his father remarried. Miranda and his father didn't get along very well; he kept his distance from his brothers and stepmother as well. Miranda's first criminal conviction was during his eighth-grade year. The following year, he was convicted of burglary and sentenced to a year in reform school.

In 1956, about a month after his release from the Arizona State Industrial School for Boys (ASISB), he ran afoul of the law once more and was returned to ASISB. Upon his second release from reform school, he relocated to Los Angeles, California. Within months of his arrival in LA, Miranda was arrested (but not convicted) on suspicion of armed robbery and for some sex offenses. After two and a half years in custody, the 18-year-old Miranda was extradited back to Arizona.

He drifted through the southern U.S. for a few months, spending time in jail in Texas for living on the street without money or a place to live, and was arrested in Nashville, Tennessee, for driving a stolen car. Miranda was sentenced to a year and a day in the federal prison system because he had driven the stolen vehicle across state lines. He spent his sentence in Chillicothe, Ohio, and later in Lompoc, California.

For the next couple of years, Miranda kept out of jail, working at various jobs, until he became a laborer on the night loading dock for the Phoenix produce company. At that time he started living with Twila Hoffman, a 29-year-old mother of a boy and a girl by another man, from whom she could not afford to obtain a divorce.

Confession without rights; Miranda v. Arizona

On March 13, 1963, Miranda's truck was spotted and license plates recognized by the brother of an 18-year-old kidnapping and rape victim, Lois Ann Jameson (the victim had given the brother a description). With his description of the car and a partial license plate number, Phoenix police officers Carroll Cooley and Wilfred Young confronted Miranda, who voluntarily accompanied them to the police station and participated in a lineup. At the time, Miranda was a person of interest, and not formally in custody.

After the lineup, when Miranda asked how he did, the police implied that he was positively identified, at which point he was placed under arrest, and brought to an interrogation room. After two hours of interrogation, some of which regarded another offense for which Miranda was separately tried and convicted, Miranda hand-wrote a confession to the kidnapping and rape of Jameson. At the top of each sheet was the printed certification that "…this statement has been made voluntarily and of my own free will, with no threats, coercion or promises of immunity and with full knowledge of my legal rights, understanding any statement I make can and will be used against me." After confessing to the officers, Miranda was brought to meet the victim for positive voice identification. Asked by officers in her presence whether this was the victim, he said, "That's the girl." The victim stated that the sound of Miranda's voice matched that of the culprit.

Despite the printed statement on top of the sheets that Miranda used to write his confession, "with full knowledge of my legal rights," he was not informed of his right to have an attorney present or of his right to remain silent when he was arrested or before his interrogation. 73-year-old Alvin Moore was assigned to represent him at his trial. The trial was conducted in mid-June 1963 before Maricopa County Superior Court Judge Yale McFate.

Moore objected to entering the confession by Miranda as evidence during the trial but was overruled. Mostly because of the confession, Miranda was convicted of rape and kidnapping and sentenced to 20 to 30 years in prison on both charges. Moore appealed to the Arizona Supreme Court, but the conviction was upheld there.

Filing as a pauper, Miranda submitted his plea for a writ of certiorari, or request for review of his case to the U.S. Supreme Court in June 1965. After Alvin Moore was unable to continue representing Miranda because of health reasons, the American Civil Liberties Union (ACLU) attorney Robert J. Corcoran asked John J. Flynn, a criminal defense attorney, to serve pro bono, along with his partner, John P. Frank, and associates Paul G. Ulrich and Robert A. Jensen of the law firm Lewis & Roca in Phoenix to represent Miranda. They wrote a 2500-word petition for certiorari arguing that Miranda's Fifth Amendment rights had been violated, and they submitted it to the United States Supreme Court.

Miranda v. Arizona

In November 1965, the Supreme Court agreed to hear Miranda's case, Miranda v. Arizona, along with three other similar cases to clear all confusion created by the decision in Escobedo v. Illinois. That previous case had ruled that: Under the circumstances of this case, where a police investigation is no longer a general inquiry into an unsolved crime but has begun to focus on a particular suspect in police custody who has been refused an opportunity to consult with his counsel and who has not been warned of his constitutional right to keep silent, the accused has been denied the assistance of counsel in violation of the Sixth and Fourteenth Amendments, and no statement extracted by the police during the interrogation may be used against him at a trial. Crooker v. California, 357 U.S. 433, and Cicenia v. Lagay, 357 U.S. 504, distinguished, and, to the extent that they may be inconsistent with the instant case, they are not controlling. 479–492.
In January 1966, Flynn and Frank submitted their argument stating that Miranda's Sixth Amendment right to counsel had been violated by the Phoenix Police Department. Two weeks later the State of Arizona responded by asserting that Miranda's rights had not been violated. The first day of the case was on the last day of February 1966. Because of the three companion cases and other information, the case had a second day of oral arguments on March 1, 1966.

John Flynn for Miranda outlined the case and then stated that Miranda had not been advised of his right to remain silent when he had been arrested and questioned, adding the Fifth Amendment argument to his case. Flynn contended that an emotionally disturbed man like Miranda, who had a limited education, should not be expected to know his Fifth Amendment right not to incriminate himself.

Gary Nelson spoke for the people of Arizona, arguing that this was not a Fifth Amendment issue but just an attempt to expand the Sixth Amendment Escobedo decision. He urged the justices to clarify their position, but not to push the limits of Escobedo too far. He then told the court that forcing police to advise suspects of their rights would seriously obstruct public safety.

The second day concerned arguments from related cases. Thurgood Marshall, the former NAACP attorney, was the last to argue.  In his capacity as the Solicitor General, he presented the Johnson administration's view of the case:  that the government did not have the resources to appoint a lawyer for every indigent person who was accused of a crime.

Chief Justice Earl Warren wrote the opinion in Miranda v. Arizona. The decision was in favor of Miranda. It stated that:
The person in custody must, prior to interrogation, be clearly informed that he has the right to remain silent, and that anything he says will be used against him in court; he must be clearly informed that he has the right to consult with a lawyer and to have the lawyer with him during interrogation, and that, if he is indigent, a lawyer will be appointed to represent him.

The opinion was released on June 13, 1966. Because of the decision, police departments throughout the U.S. started to issue Miranda warning cards for their officers to recite. They read:
You have the right to remain silent. If you give up the right to remain silent, anything you say can and will be used against you in a court of law. You have the right to an attorney and to have an attorney present during questioning. If you cannot afford an attorney, one will be provided to you at no cost. During any questioning, you may decide at any time to exercise these rights, not answer any questions or make any statements. Do you understand these rights as I have read them to you?

Life after Miranda v. Arizona and death

The Supreme Court invalidated Miranda's conviction, which was tainted by the use of the confession that had been obtained through improper interrogation.  The state of Arizona retried him.  At the second trial, his confession was not introduced into evidence, but he was convicted again, on March 1, 1967, based on testimony given by his estranged common-law wife. He was sentenced to 20 to 30 years in prison.

Miranda was paroled in 1972. After his release, he started selling autographed Miranda warning cards for $1.50. Over the next few years, Miranda was arrested numerous times for minor driving offenses and eventually lost his license. He was arrested for the possession of a gun but the charges were dropped. However, because this violated his parole, he was sent back to Arizona State Prison for another year.

On January 31, 1976, after his release for violating his parole, a fight erupted in a bar in downtown Phoenix in which Miranda was stabbed. He was pronounced dead on arrival at Good Samaritan Hospital. Several Miranda cards were found on his person. Miranda was buried in the City of Mesa Cemetery in Mesa, Arizona. The person suspected of handing the knife to the man who murdered Miranda invoked his Miranda rights and refused to talk to police. He was released and never charged with Miranda's murder. The killer fled and was never found.

References

External links

 
 Court TV
 
 Miranda v. Arizona, 384 U.S. 436 (1966)
 Miranda case 

1941 births
1976 deaths
1976 murders in the United States
20th-century American criminals
American male criminals
American murder victims
American rapists
American people convicted of kidnapping
American people convicted of rape
American prisoners and detainees
Burials in Arizona
Criminals from Arizona
Deaths by stabbing in Arizona
 
Murdered criminals
People from Mesa, Arizona
People murdered in Arizona
Prisoners and detainees of Arizona
American people of Mexican descent